Killing Time is an Australian television drama series on TV1 subscription television channel which first screened in 2011. It is based on the true story of disgraced lawyer Andrew Fraser. In New Zealand it screens on Prime Television.

Background
Born in Melbourne in 1951, for thirty years Andrew Fraser was one of Australia's leading criminal lawyers. He defended underworld families the Morans and the Pettingills, businessman Alan Bond, and footballer Jimmy Krakauer.

With success came cocaine addiction ending in 1999 with Fraser being charged with being knowingly concerned with an importation of cocaine, serious charges that received no mercy. This was the end of life as Fraser had known. He admitted himself into hospital and withdrew from use. This was the start of the long road to recovery, remaining drug free for the two years he was on bail and has remained so ever since.

Fraser pleaded guilty and was sentenced in 2001 to seven years imprisonment with a minimum of five. Despite being a low risk prisoner, Fraser was sent to a maximum-security housing thirty-eight of the most dangerous criminals in Victoria. During that period Fraser heard (and reported) disturbing tales from Australia's most notorious prisoners.

Television series 
Killing Time is a television mini-series based on Fraser's experiences.  It was produced in 2009 by FremantleMedia, TV1 and Film Victoria. David Wenham portrays Fraser in the series.

Overview
Andrew Fraser is a lawyer who defends high-profile clients such as Dennis Allen, Jimmy Krakouer, Alan Bond and those accused of the Walsh Street murders.

Production
The ten part series is written by Ian David, Mac Gudgeon, Katherine Thompson and Shaun Grant. The executive producer is Jason Stephens. The series was initially due to screen in 2010 but was deferred due to strong violence and horror content scenes of the mini-series, which jeopardised a series of gangland trials that were in progress.

Main cast
 David Wenham as Andrew Fraser
 Diana Glenn as Denise Fraser
 Colin Friels as Lewis Moran
 Richard Cawthorne as Dennis Allen
 Kris McQuade as Kath Pettingill
 Malcom Kennard as Victor Peirce

Supporting cast
 Kate Jenkinson as Wendy Peirce
 Reef Ireland as Jason Ryan
 Martin Sharpe as Trevor Pettingill
 Fletcher Humphrys as Graeme Jensen
 Frank Sweet as Anthony Farrell Jr
 John Brumpton as Peter Dupas
 Nick Farnell as Detective Alan Daniels
 Peter Houghton as Detective Alex Schneider
 Ian Bliss as Detective Inspector Patterson
 Kerry Walker as Sheila Fraser
 Terry Norris as Rod Fraser
 Louise Crawford as Sally Fraser
 Steve Mouzakis as Chris Baros
 Fred Whitlock as Leslie Camilleri
 Tony Nikolakopoulos as Manny The Mutt
 John Wood as Alan Bond
 Anthony Hayes as John Bond
 Robert Rabiah as Anthony Della Tranta 
 Nicholas Bell as Rod Conroy
 Brett Swain as Prison Officer Griffiths
 Alan King as David Casey
 Shane Connor as Detective Sergeant Wayne Strawhorn
 Aaron Catalan as Detective Sergeant Malcolm Rosenes

References

External links
 Official website
 
– List of Andrew Fraser books

TV1 (Australian TV channel) original programming
Seven Network original programming
2010s Australian drama television series
2011 Australian television series debuts
2012 Australian television series endings
English-language television shows
2010s Australian crime television series